CEU San Pablo University is a private Catholic university in Madrid, Spain.

It is involved in a number of academic exchange programmes with renowned universities worldwide (Columbia, Chicago, Duke, Boston, Colgate), work practice schemes and international projects with over 200 higher education institutions in Europe, Latin America, North America and Asia.

It is run by the Centro de Estudios Universitarios (CEU Foundation).

History

It was a college of the Complutense University of Madrid until it was segregated in 1993 to be established as an independent university.

References

External links
Official website
Emeritus Professor Dalmacio Negro

Catholic universities and colleges in Spain
Universities in Madrid
Educational institutions established in 1993
1993 establishments in Spain